Berlin Opera may refer to:

 Staatsoper Unter den Linden (State Opera Unter den Linden), opened in 1742 as Königliche Hofoper (Royal Court Opera)
 Deutsche Oper Berlin (German Opera Berlin), opened in 1912 as Deutsches Opernhaus (German Opera House)
 Komische Oper Berlin (Comical Opera Berlin), opened in 1892 as Theater Unter den Linden
 Berlin Opera Academy (Comical Opera Berlin), opened in 2015 in collaboration with Opernfest